The 1995 Men's Champions Trophy was the 17th edition of the Hockey Champions Trophy, an annual international men's field hockey tournament organized by the FIH. It took place from 23 September to 1 October 1995, in the Olympia Stadium in Berlin, Germany.

Germany won the tournament for the sixth time by defeating Australia 4–2 in a Penalty shoot-out in the final after a 2–2 draw.

Results

Pool

Classification

Fifth and sixth place

Third and fourth place

Final

Statistics

Final standings

Goalscorers

References

External links
Official FIH website

Champions Trophy
Hockey Champions Trophy Men
International field hockey competitions hosted by Germany
Champions Trophy (field hockey)
Sports competitions in Berlin
Hockey Champions Trophy Men
Hockey Champions Trophy Men
Hockey Champions Trophy Men